Wellingborough Cablevision was a cable television broadcaster that operated in the Wellingborough area of Northamptonshire, England, during a period of experimental licensing of cable community television in the 1970s. It was run by a consortium of local businesses and existed for exactly a year to 24 March 1975.

See also 
 List of former TV channels in the United Kingdom
 Television in the United Kingdom

References

Further reading 
  
 

Community television channels in the United Kingdom
Mass media in Northamptonshire
Television channels and stations established in 1974
1974 establishments in England
Defunct television channels in the United Kingdom
Television channels and stations disestablished in 1975
1975 disestablishments in England